Shawn Michael Menard (born April 14, 1982) is a Canadian politician. He was elected to Ottawa City Council representing Capital Ward in the 2018 Ottawa municipal election.

Menard grew up in Ottawa, the son of a single mother. He graduated from Sir Robert Borden High School, and studied criminology and public administration at Carleton University. At Carleton, Menard was the president of the Rideau River Residence Association and later the president of the Carleton University Students' Association. He graduated from Carleton with a master's degree in Public Policy and Administration.

After university, Menard worked as a strategic analyst for the Department of Justice and then as manager of government relations for the Federation of Canadian Municipalities. He was also involved in neighbourhood politics, serving as president of the Centretown Citizens Community Association and established an umbrella group of community associations called "Our Ottawa".

Menard was elected as a public school trustee for the Ottawa-Carleton District School Board in the 2014 municipal elections with no opposition. He represented Zone 9, which covers both Capital and Rideau-Vanier Wards.

Menard had planned on running for re-election as a school trustee for the 2018 election, but entered the race for city council when fellow-progressive Emilie Taman opted to not run. Many had also wanted Menard to run for mayor.

Menard ran on a progressive platform of reducing fares for public transportation, barring planning committee members from taking developer donations, and eliminating single use plastics. Often a critic of mayor Jim Watson Menard endorsed Watson's rival Clive Doucet in the 2018 mayoral race. Menard was elected winning 28% of the vote, defeating his nearest rival Christine McAllister by fewer than 400 votes and incumbent David Chernushenko by just under 600 votes. Menard claimed the win as a "referendum on development" in the area, while Chernushenko blamed his defeat on being out organized by an "NDP campaign".

Menard is running for a second term on Ottawa City Council in the 2022 Ottawa Municipal Election, and has endorsed Catherine McKenney for mayor.

Election Results

2018 Ottawa municipal election

2014 Ottawa municipal election

References

Living people
1982 births
Ottawa city councillors
Carleton University alumni
Ontario school board trustees